Forks of the Credit may refer to:

 Forks of the Credit Provincial Park, a park in Ontario, Canada
 Forks of the Credit, Ontario, a community within Caledon, Ontario